Suite sixtine is the second LP by Belgian pop singer Lio, released in 1982. It is not considered to be a proper studio album as it is a mixture of b-sides, English versions of previous songs and a few unreleased tracks.

Singles

Release information and re-issues
The album was originally released exclusively to the Canadian market. A Japanese release followed in 1996. Finally, it was released in France in 2005 as part of Ze Records's reissue of Lio's discography; this re-issue has four bonus tracks, including the extended version of the single "Sage comme une image".

Track listing

Personnel
 Liner Notes, Design [Digipack & Booklet Design] – Michel Esteban
 Photography By [Front Cover] – Jean-Baptiste Mondino
 Recorded By – Alan Ward
 Remastered By – Charlus de la Salle

References

1982 albums
Lio albums